Joel Johnson Alajarín (born 20 September 1992) is a Liberian footballer who plays as a right-back for USL League One club Charlotte Independence.

Club career
Born in Torrent, Valencia, to a Liberian father and a Spanish mother, Johnson was a product of Valencia CF's youth system. He made his senior debut at only 17, appearing with the reserves in the Segunda División B and suffering relegation in 2010.

On 8 March 2010, as both right-backs in the first team, Bruno and Miguel, were unavailable, Johnson made his first La Liga appearance, playing the full 90 minutes in a 0–0 home draw against Racing de Santander. Released on 30 June 2012, he went on to compete solely in the lower leagues, first with Real Madrid C and then with Real Jaén, both in the third tier.

After a season with CD Buñol in the Tercera División, Johnson signed with USL Championship side Charlotte Independence on 6 April 2016. Six years later, he joined Hartford Athletic of the same country and league.

International career
Johnson received his first call for the Liberia national team on 31 August 2016, being an unused substitute in the 4–1 away loss to Tunisia for the 2017 Africa Cup of Nations qualifying phase the following week. He only won his first cap on 9 September 2018, starting and playing 90 minutes in a 1–1 draw against DR Congo for the 2019 Africa Cup of Nations qualifiers.

References

External links

1992 births
Living people
People from Torrent, Valencia
Spanish people of Liberian descent
Liberian people of Spanish descent
People with acquired Liberian citizenship
Spanish sportspeople of African descent
Sportspeople of Liberian descent
Sportspeople from the Province of Valencia
Spanish footballers
Liberian footballers
Footballers from the Valencian Community
Association football defenders
La Liga players
Segunda División B players
Tercera División players
Valencia CF Mestalla footballers
Valencia CF players
Real Madrid C footballers
Real Jaén footballers
USL Championship players
USL League One players
Charlotte Independence players
Hartford Athletic players
Liberia international footballers
Spanish expatriate footballers
Liberian expatriate footballers
Expatriate soccer players in the United States
Spanish expatriate sportspeople in the United States
Liberian expatriate sportspeople in the United States